Porphyrodesme is a genus of flowering plants from the orchid family, Orchidaceae.  It contains 3 currently accepted species as of June 2014:

Porphyrodesme hewittii (Ames) Garay - Sarawak
Porphyrodesme papuana Schltr. - Papua New Guinea, Sabah
Porphyrodesme sarcanthoides (J.J.Sm.) Mahyar - Sulawesi, Borneo, Sumatra

See also 
 List of Orchidaceae genera

References 

 Berg Pana, H. 2005. Handbuch der Orchideen-Namen. Dictionary of Orchid Names. Dizionario dei nomi delle orchidee. Ulmer, Stuttgart

External links 
 

Vandeae genera
Aeridinae